Chanderi may refer to:

 Chanderi, a town in Ashoknagar district of Madhya Pradesh, India
 Chanderi District, a former district of British India
 Chanderi fort
 Chanderi (Vidhan Sabha constituency), an assembly constituency
 Chanderi, Bhopal, a village in Bhopal district of Madhya Pradesh, India